Aircraft End-of-Life Solutions (AELS) B.V.  is a company that disassembles and dismantles aircraft that are out of service or retired. The company is situated in Enschede, Netherlands and has the ability to scrap worldwide.

The processes of AELS have been accredited by the Aircraft Fleet Recycling Association in April 2010. AELS is also member of the Netherlands Aerospace Group.

References

External links

Aircraft recycling
Delft
Renewable resource companies established in 2006
Waste management companies of the Netherlands
Dutch companies established in 2006